Walter's Hot Dog Stand is a National Register of Historic Places designated landmark located in Mamaroneck in Westchester County, New York.

History
Walter's is a family business founded in 1919 by Walter Warrington in Mamaroneck, NY. His first stand,  on Boston Post Road, was in front of Skinner's Floral shop near the-then Central School (now Town of Mamaroneck offices). He sold cider and apples from an orchard he had purchased on Quaker Ridge.

Later, Walter moved south on Post Road, in Shepard's Field (approximately where Richbell Road now meets Post Road). It was here that he began selling his unique brand of hot dogs, blended from beef, pork, and veal, with the wieners split-grilled. At Shepard's Field Walter constructed a cider press to make apple cider.

There were blueprints for a stand to be built on an adjacent property on Post Road that would include a residence on the second floor. The property was, however, condemned by the School Board; a junior high school was built in 1926 (now a campus of Mamaroneck High). In 1928 he purchased the property at 937 Palmer Avenue, where his then-new pagoda has been since.  The shop was closed for renovations for several months in 2014.

The Palmer Avenue building has a pagoda-style copper roof, now oxidized to a light green, and dragon lanterns.  It is an example of roadside architecture.

Walter's son Eugene, who owned the business for over 60 years, died in 2017.

Acclaim
The stand has been featured in the New York Times; and on CBS News Sunday Morning in 2003.

In 2010 it was listed on the National Register of Historic Places.

In 2015, The Daily Meal ranked Walter's Hot Dogs #13 in America's 75 Best Hot Dogs

See also
National Register of Historic Places listings in southern Westchester County, New York

References

Sources
"The Artful Hot Dog" by Fred Ferretti. The New York Times. August 12, 1979.
"Fast Food: The Little Spots" by Lynne Ames. The New York Times. August 14, 1977

External links

Official website
Walter’s Hot Dogs Turns 85
Zagat.com review

Mamaroneck, New York
Restaurants in New York (state)
Hot dog restaurants in the United States
Commercial buildings on the National Register of Historic Places in New York (state)
National Register of Historic Places in Westchester County, New York
1919 establishments in New York (state)
Buildings and structures in Westchester County, New York
Tourist attractions in Westchester County, New York
Restaurants established in 1919
Restaurants on the National Register of Historic Places